The 1993 Arena Football League season was the seventh season of the Arena Football League (AFL). The league champions were the Tampa Bay Storm, who defeated the Detroit Drive in ArenaBowl VII. The AFL also re-aligned to two conferences.

Team movement
The New Orleans Night and the San Antonio Force both ceased operations and the Sacramento Attack relocated to Miami to become the Miami Hooters. The Denver Dynamite remained inactive.

Standings

z – clinched homefield advantage

y – clinched division title

x – clinched playoff spot

Playoffs

Awards and honors

Regular season awards

All-Arena team

References